Indrani Sen is a  Bengali singer who is known for Nazrul geeti and Rabindra Sangeet.

Early life
Indrani Sen is the daughter of singer Sumitra Sen, and her younger sister is Srabani Sen. Her earliest singing was done under her mother's guidance; she then attended Bengal Music College at the University of Calcutta, and was later trained by Debabrata Biswas in classical and Purabi Dutta in Nazrul geeti.

She is also the head of the department of economics at Women's College,Calcutta in Kolkata.

Her mother, Sumitra Sen died on 3 January 2023 at the age of 89.

Awards & achievements
She won BFJA's Best Female Playback Award- 1993 for the film Shwet Patharer Thala and BFJA's Best Female Playback Award- 1995 for the film Sandhya Tara.

She is a playback singer for Hindi films, Bengali films and T. V serials, and the recipient of several awards, including Banga Bhushan from the Government of West Bengal. Sen  performed at the joint India and Bangladesh celebrations marking the 150th anniversary of Nobel laureate Rabindranath Tagore at the Indira Gandhi Cultural Centre (IGCC), High Commission of India in 2012.

References

External Links
 

Indian women classical singers
Performers of Hindu music
Singers from Kolkata
Bengali singers
Bengal Music College alumni
University of Calcutta alumni
Living people
Rabindra Sangeet exponents
Year of birth missing (living people)
20th-century Indian women singers
20th-century Indian singers
Women musicians from West Bengal
20th-century women composers